Joseph Delaney  (1904November 21, 1991) was a black American artist who became a part of the New York art scene at the time of the Harlem Renaissance. He received a fellowship from the Rosenwald Foundation.

Early life and education
Delaney was born in Knoxville, Tennessee, one of ten children of a Methodist minister. He was the younger brother of Beauford Delaney, with whom he shared an interest in drawing. Delaney dropped out of school in ninth grade.  In his late teens and early 20s, Delaney spent a period of years without a settled home before joining the Eighth Infantry Regiment, Illinois National Guard.

In 1930, Delaney moved to New York City, where he enrolled in the Art Students League of New York. At the Art Students League he studied with Alexander Brook, figure drawing with George Bridgman, and human anatomy under Thomas Hart Benton. He experimented with the expressive line. Delaney later cited Benton as a major influence, saying, "Benton will be with me always". During his free time, Delaney sketched the people and places around him.

Career 
During the Great Depression, he was employed by the Works Progress Administration. He taught children's art classes, drew renderings of silver by Paul Revere, and in 1943 he was named to the WPA’s prestigious Easel Painting Division. Around the time that the WPA ceased to operate, Delaney was awarded a grant from the Julius Rosenwald Fund. From the summer of 1942 until January 1943, he used the grant to travel the eastern seaboard and create a series that documented the lives of black laborers. In 1978 and 1979, he worked as a painter as part of the Cultural Council Foundation CETA Artists Project in New York City.

Delaney lived and worked in New York until 1986, showing his work in New York’s Washington Square for decades.

In 1986 he returned to Knoxville to become an artist-in-residence at the University of Tennessee, a position he held until his death in 1991.

Throughout his life, Delaney was committed to opposing racial discrimination, and his work reveals a "deep concern for the lives of common people."

Legacy 
The Art Institute of Chicago, the Knoxville Museum of Art, the Museum of the City of New York, the Indianapolis Museum of Art, the David Owsley Museum of Art and the Smithsonian American Art Museum are among the museums holding works by Joseph Delaney. In 1968, he published a pamphlet which summarized his experience as an artist in New York entitled, Thirty-six Years Exhibiting in the Washington Square Outdoor Art Show.

Exhibitions

References

Further reading 
  Frederick C. Moffatt. 2009. The Life, Art, and Times of Joseph Delaney, 1904–1991.

1904 births
1991 deaths
People from Knoxville, Tennessee
Painters from Tennessee
American male painters
20th-century American painters
Art Students League of New York alumni
People of the New Deal arts projects
University of Tennessee faculty
20th-century African-American painters
20th-century American male artists